XHIMR-FM is a radio station in Mexico City. Broadcasting on 107.9 FM from a tower in Ajusco, XHIMR is owned by the Instituto Mexicano de la Radio and broadcasts a jazz music format under the brand name Horizonte 107.9.

History
XHIMR-FM received its permit late in 1999; with a three-month deadline to come on air, it signed on February 15, 2000 as "Horizonte 108" utilizing content from other IMER stations, particularly XHOF-FM. The station's original programming included New Age and electronic music, which was eliminated early on, as well as informative programs in the lead-up to the 2000 presidential election. This content was deemphasized as time went on, with the station focusing on jazz and world music in its programming.

In 2005, XHIMR boosted its power to 30 kW from its original 10, while dropping the "108" moniker (which had confused listeners). In 2010, it increased its jazz focus.

Format
Horizonte 107.9 primarily broadcasts jazz music.

HD Programming
The station broadcasts in HD Radio; this transmission was formally launched on September 17, 2012. 
HD2 is Radio Ciudadana (XEDTL-AM 660), 
HD3 is Musica del mundo. It has been silent since mid-2019.

References

Jazz radio stations
Radio stations established in 2000
Radio stations in Mexico City